Ri Ho-rim is a North Korean politician. He is a member of the Politburo of the Central Committee of the Workers' Party of Korea. He is Director of the Central United Front Department. In 2019 he became an alternate member of the Politburo. In March 2020 he was seen voting in a meeting of the Politburo, a right reserved for full members only, and thus it was assumed he has become a full member.

References

Workers' Party of Korea politicians
Year of birth missing (living people)
Living people